The 1975 Apollo–Soyuz Test Project version of the Soyuz spacecraft (Soyuz 7K-TM) served as a technological bridge to the third generation Soyuz-T  (T - транспортный, Transportnyi meaning transport) spacecraft (1976–1986). 

The Soyuz ASTP spacecraft was designed for use during the Apollo Soyuz Test Project as Soyuz 19. It featured design changes to increase compatibility with the American craft. The Soyuz ASTP featured new solar panels for increased mission length, an APAS-75 docking mechanism instead of the standard male mechanism and modifications to the environmental control system to lower the cabin pressure to 0.68 atmospheres (69 kPa) prior to docking with Apollo. The ASTP Soyuz backup craft flew as the Soyuz 22 mission, replacing the docking port with a camera.

Uncrewed Missions
Cosmos 638
Cosmos 672

Crewed missions
 Soyuz 16
 Soyuz 19 (ASTP)
 Soyuz 22

Images

External links
 Russia New Russian spaceship will be able to fly to Moon - space corp
 RSC Energia: Concept Of Russian Manned Space Navigation Development
Mir Hardware Heritage
David S.F. Portree, Mir Hardware Heritage, NASA RP-1357, 1995
Mir Hardware Heritage (wikisource)
 Information on Soyuz spacecraft
OMWorld's ASTP Docking Trainer Page
NASA - Russian Soyuz TMA Spacecraft Details
Space Adventures circum-lunar mission - details

Crewed spacecraft
Soyuz program
Vehicles introduced in 1976
Apollo–Soyuz Test Project